There are 13 National parks in North Carolina.  Only the Great Smoky Mountains National Park is a traditional park.  The Great Smoky Mountains National Park is also a World Heritage Site.  Other parks include heritage areas, historic sites, national seashores, historic trails, and memorials managed by the National Park Service.  Several of the parks include other states besides North Carolina.

Areas

See also List of National Natural Landmarks in North Carolina

References

 Service Areas
 
Landmarks in North Carolina